This list is of the Cultural Properties of Japan designated in the category of  for the Prefecture of Kumamoto.

National Cultural Properties
As of 1 July 2019, two Important Cultural Properties have been designated, being of national significance.

Prefectural Cultural Properties
Properties designated at a prefectural level include:

See also
 Cultural Properties of Japan
 List of National Treasures of Japan (paintings)
 Japanese painting
 List of Historic Sites of Japan (Kumamoto)
 List of Cultural Properties of Japan - historical materials (Kumamoto)
 Kumamoto Prefectural Ancient Burial Mound Museum

References

Cultural Properties,Kumamoto
Cultural Properties,Paintings
Paintings,Kumamoto
Lists of paintings